The slaty-headed tody-flycatcher (Poecilotriccus sylvia) is a species of bird in the family Tyrannidae, and one of twelve in the genus Poecilotriccus.

It is found in Belize, Brazil, Colombia, Costa Rica, French Guiana, Guatemala, Guyana, Honduras, Mexico, Nicaragua, Panama, and Venezuela. Its natural habitats are subtropical or tropical dry forest, subtropical or tropical moist lowland forest, and heavily degraded former forest.

References

Further reading

slaty-headed tody-flycatcher
Birds of Central America
Birds of Belize
Birds of Colombia
Birds of Venezuela
Birds of the Guianas
Birds of Brazil
slaty-headed tody-flycatcher
Taxonomy articles created by Polbot